Pelargoderus alcanor is a species of beetle in the family Cerambycidae. It is known from Newman in 1842, originally under the genus Monohammus. It is known from Sulawesi and the Philippines.

Subspecies
 Pelargoderus alcanor alcanor (Newman, 1842)
 Pelargoderus alcanor thomsoni Aurivillius, 1921

References

alcanor
Beetles described in 1842